Magnus Stamnestrø (born 18 April 1992) is a former Norwegian footballer. He has represented his country at under-19 and under-21 level.

Stamnestrø transferred from KIL/Hemne to Molde FK in 2010, and made his debut in Tippeligaen the same year. He won the league with Molde in both 2011 and 2012. He was sent on a season-long loan deal to Sogndal in April 2013. In 2014, he was first sent on loan to Kristiansund BK, and after the first half of the season the loan was made into a permanent transfer. In July 2015 he bought by Rosenborg BK.

Club career
Hailing from Kyrksæterøra, Stamnestrø played for KIL/Hemne while growing up and transferred to Molde in 2010. He made his debut in Tippeligaen in the 3–3 draw against Lillestrøm in the 14th round of the 2010 season. Molde were leading 3–0 when the teams had played 90 minutes, but Lillestrøm managed to score three times during the stoppage time. Stamnestrø made three appearances as a substitute in the 2011 season when Molde won the league for the first time, before he started his first match Tippeligaen-match in the last match of the season against Sogndal.

He scored his first goal in Tippeligaen in the 4–3 victory against Stabæk in October 2012. During the 2012 season, Stamnestrø played nine matches in Tippeligaen, five cup-matches and four European matches, and scored a total of five goals. Stamnestrø signed a new three-year contract with Molde in November 2012.

Stamnestrø had to have a surgery in December 2012 due to an ankle-injury, and missed the entire pre-season ahead of the 2013 season. He was sent on a season-long loan-deal in April 2013, to the Tippeligaen side Sogndal to have a better chance to play first-team football. He made his debut for Sogndal when he replaced Ruben Holsæter in the match against Rosenborg on 7 April 2013. He also came on as a substitute in the following match, and scored the match-winning goal in the 2–1 victory against Molde, which was their fourth loss in as many matches. Molde's start of the season in 2013 was the worst opening by a defending champion in Norway.

In 2014, he went on a season's loan to second-tier club Kristiansund BK, a deal that later the same year was made permanent. After 4 season at Rosenborg when he played his last game in 2016, he went to the local club Ranheim in the summer of 2018.

International career
Stamnestrø got his first match for Norway at youth international level, when he played the under-19 team against Portugal U19 in February 2011 on La Manga Club in Spain. He played a total of three matches, scoring one goal for Norway U19. In October 2012, the under-19 team became the new under-21 team and Stamnestrø scored a goal in both friendly matches against Netherlands U-21. Stamnestrø was one of few that played every minute in both matches, and he was also the team's captain in one of the matches.

Career statistics

Club

Honours
 Molde
Norwegian League (2): 2011, 2012

 Rosenborg
Norwegian League (2): 2015, 2016
Norwegian Football Cup (2): 2015, 2016, 2018

 KÍ Klaksvík
Faroese Premier League (1): 2019

References

1992 births
Living people
People from Hemne
Norwegian footballers
Norway under-21 international footballers
Norway youth international footballers
Molde FK players
Sogndal Fotball players
Kristiansund BK players
Rosenborg BK players
Ranheim Fotball players
KÍ Klaksvík players
Eliteserien players
Norwegian First Division players
Faroe Islands Premier League players
Association football midfielders
Norwegian expatriate footballers
Expatriate footballers in the Faroe Islands
Norwegian expatriate sportspeople in the Faroe Islands
Sportspeople from Trøndelag